Zhang Kaiming (born 17 May 1990) is a Chinese footballer currently playing as a defender for Dalian Duxing.

Career statistics

Club
.

Notes

References

1990 births
Living people
Chinese footballers
Association football defenders
China League One players
China League Two players
Jiangxi Beidamen F.C. players
Hainan Boying F.C. players